Siddiqullah Chowdhury (Bengali: সিদ্দিকুল্লাহ চৌধুরী) is an Indian politician  from the state of West Bengal. He is the representative of Manteswar constituency in the West Bengal Legislative Assembly as a member of the All India Trinamool Congress (AITC) party. He is also the president of the Jamiat Ulema-e-Hind's West Bengal branch.

Political career 
Chowdhury contested the 1984 and 1989 Lok Sabha elections from Katwa constituency as a candidate of the Indian National Congress. Chowdhury has become a prominent figure in state politics during Nandigram Movement. Chowdhury also contested from the Basirhat seat as a candidate of the All India United Democratic Front in the 2014 Lok Sabha election.

In January 2016, Chowdhury hinted at the possibility of his Jamiat Ulema-e-Hind party entering into a pre-poll alliance for the 2016 West Bengal Assembly elections.

In March 2016, it was announced that Chowdhury would contest from the Mangalkot constituency as a candidate of the Trinamool Congress party. He said that the Mamata Banerjee-led government has worked for the development of minorities. He won the election by defeating his nearest rival, Sahajahan Chowdhury of Communist Party of India (Marxist), by nearly twelve thousand votes. He was subsequently made a cabinet minister and given the portfolio of minister of state with independent charge in mass education, library, and parliamentary affairs. He became one of the seven Muslims who was made a cabinet minister.

In December 2016, Chowdhury stated in an interview with the Indian Express that only 1.5% of West Bengal's population was using the government libraries. In response, Chowdhury said that the government was taking steps to "turn people back towards books and libraries". He also said that journals, magazines, and books about agriculture must be present in libraries funded by state government.

Views

Indian Muslims 
Chowdhury is of the opinion that Muslims should not learn patriotism from other citizens of the country or from the government. According to him, if Muslims had not participated in the Indian freedom struggle, then it would have taken "another 100 years" for India to become independent. He said that if India became a Hindu state, then India would collapse.

Government of Bangladesh 
Chowdhury is critical of the Sheikh Hasina led government of Bangladesh. He has criticised the government for their treatment of the Razakars (an anti Bangladeshi paramilitary force organised by Pakistani army during the Bangladesh Liberation War of 1971) whom he has hailed as "religious leaders". He also said that assaulting pious citizens was a part of the Bangladesh government's conspiracy.

Triple Talaq
In August 2016, the Supreme Court of India banned the controversial practice of triple talaq (oral instant divorce). Reacting to it, Chowdhury said that the practice was an integral part of Islam. He termed the verdict of supreme court as "unconstitutional" and criticised it for interfering in Islamic laws. He also said that Muslims would continue to follow the sharia (Islamic laws). Opposition Bharatiya Janata Party national secretary Rahul Sinha demanded his arrest as according to him, Chowdhury refused to abide by the laws of the country.

Controversies 
On 17 May 2017, Ebela reported that Chowdhury was using a red beacon on his car to avoid traffic congestion after a Central BJP Govt. order the previous month banned its use. He defended himself by contrasting his usage of the beacon with that of Noor ur Rahman Barkati, imam of Tipu Sultan Mosque, who had previously been spotted using it. Chowdhury said that unlike Barkati, his beacon was given to him by the state government and he had not received any notice from that authority to discontinue its use.

Regarding Barkati, Chowdhury commented that if he is to continue to live in India, he must follow Indian rules. He also stated his belief that Barkati would obtain a political position in Pakistan. Consequently, Barkati was sacked from his post.

References

Year of birth missing (living people)
Living people
Bengali Muslims
Politicians from Kolkata
West Bengal MLAs 2016–2021
Trinamool Congress politicians from West Bengal